Viktor Trenevski (born 8 October 1972) is a Macedonian football manager and former player.

A former Macedonia international, Trenevski made 17 appearances for Macedonia between 1997 and 2004.

Club career
Born in Skopje, Trenevski moved at an early age to Titograd, where his father was stationed in the Yugoslav People's Army. He started out with local club Budućnost, making his senior debut in the 1991–92 season. In the 1995 winter transfer window, Trenevski was transferred to Partizan. He remained with the Crno-beli for three and a half years, winning two national championships (1996 and 1997) and one national cup (1998). In the summer of 1998, Trenevski moved abroad and joined Mexican club Puebla. He subsequently went on trial to Brazilian club Fluminense in 1999, without signing a contract.

In the summer of 2002, Trenevski moved to Slovenia and signed with Mura. He went on to play for four other Slovenian clubs in the top flight, amassing 137 appearances and scoring 44 league goals over the course of six years. Before retiring from the game, Trenevski also played for Slovenian Third League club Malečnik in the 2008–09 season.

International career
At international level, Trenevski was capped 17 times for the Macedonia national team, making his debut in a 1–0 win over Iceland on 7 June 1997. His last cap came in a 1–0 friendly loss to China on 29 January 2004.

Managerial career
After starting his managerial career with his former club Malečnik, Trenevski was appointed manager of Slovenian Third League side Veržej in November 2011. He subsequently took charge at Slovenian Second League club Zavrč in January 2013, immediately leading them to promotion to the top flight of Slovenian football. Despite the team's initial success, Trenevski eventually left the club by mutual consent in March 2014.

In July 2015, Trenevski returned to the country of his childhood to take charge of Dečić. He was suspended by the Montenegrin FA in October 2015, receiving a six-month ban due to issues regarding his UEFA Pro Licence. In May 2016, Trenevski parted ways with the club.

On 19 July 2016, Trenevski was appointed manager of Rabotnički, replacing Tomislav Franc, following the club's elimination from the 2016–17 UEFA Europa League.

Career statistics

Club

International

Honours

Player
Partizan
 First League of FR Yugoslavia: 1995–96, 1996–97
 FR Yugoslavia Cup: 1997–98

Manager
Zavrč
 Slovenian Second League: 2012–13

References

External links
 
 
 

1972 births
Living people
Footballers from Skopje
Yugoslav footballers
Macedonian footballers
Association football midfielders
North Macedonia international footballers
FK Budućnost Podgorica players
FK Partizan players
Club Puebla players
FK Sileks players
FK Pelister players
NK Mura players
FC Koper players
NK Olimpija Ljubljana (1945–2005) players
NK Drava Ptuj players
NK Nafta Lendava players
Yugoslav First League players
First League of Serbia and Montenegro players
Liga MX players
Macedonian First Football League players
Slovenian PrvaLiga players
Macedonian expatriate footballers
Expatriate footballers in Serbia and Montenegro
Expatriate footballers in Mexico
Expatriate footballers in Slovenia
Macedonian expatriate sportspeople in Serbia and Montenegro
Macedonian expatriate sportspeople in Mexico
Macedonian expatriate sportspeople in Slovenia
Macedonian football managers
FK Dečić managers
FK Rabotnički managers
FK Kom managers
OFK Grbalj managers
Macedonian expatriate football managers
Expatriate football managers in Slovenia
Expatriate football managers in Montenegro
Macedonian expatriate sportspeople in Montenegro